During the period from the mid to late nineteenth century until the early 20th century, popularly known as the "Victorian Era," people typically used elaborate physical representations and rituals to mark the death of a loved one. Because deaths typically took place in the home, the body of the deceased was usually prepared for burial, and often displayed for a period in the home.  Because of the close proximity of death to the home, and the high mortality rates for children and infants, children were often familiar with and exposed to death and dead bodies from a very early age. By the late nineteenth century, it became customary to commission a "mourning doll" to lay at the grave of a deceased child. These became widely popular as a coping mechanism for families dealing with the death of a child.

Child death 
In Puritan New England, death was often discussed with children as a larger message about sin and the necessity of salvation to avoid eternal damnation.  In the Victorian Era, death was openly discussed with children, but in a more benign context, and children's stories often included death scenes and references to death, often with an emphasis on the joys of heaven, and the inevitable reunion with loved ones there.

Grave dolls 
While there were many practices regarding remembrance of a loved one after death, such as Post-Mortem photography and Mourning Hair Art, grave dolls became a way for parents to create an effigy of a deceased child for remembrance. When a child died, it was traditional for families who could afford it to have a life-sized wax effigy of the child made for the funeral. The doll would often be dressed in the deceased infant or child's own clothing, and most of the deceased child's own hair would be used to make the doll even more realistic.  These wax dolls usually show the deceased lying in a coffin-like setting with their eyes closed, to mimic a peaceful sleep. The backsides of the heads were made flat so that the doll would lay nicely when laid out to rest. The effigy doll would be put on display at the wake, and would then be left at the grave site. But it is known, from the effigy dolls which still exist today, that in some cases these wax effigy dolls were kept. Wax effigies of infants would be placed in a crib, their clothes would be changed, and otherwise treated like a real baby. The bodies of these wax dolls were cloth, weighted with sand to give them a more realistic feel. Sometimes the effigy itself would be framed. For older children, just the head and shoulders were used for the wax effigy, with flat backsides so that they could be placed in a picture frame.

References

External links 

Death customs
Mourning Dolls
Dolls